Cithaeronidae is a small family of araneomorph spiders first described by Simon in 1893 Female Cithaeron are about  long, males about .

They are pale yellowish, fast-moving spiders that actively hunt at night and rest during the day, building silken retreats below rocks. They prefer very hot, dry stony places.

Distribution
While Inthaeron occurs only in India, members of the genus Cithaeron are found in Africa, India and parts of Eurasia. Three adult females of C. praedonius were found in Teresina, Piauí, Brazil.  As they were found in and near human housings, they presumably were accidentally introduced. This is probably also the case for finds in the Northern Territory of Australia.

Another population of C. praedonius has been discovered in Florida U.S.A., with reports of a stable breeding population.(Pers. comm. Joseph Stiles)

Genera and Species
This section lists all described species accepted by the World Spider Catalog :

Cithaeron O. Pickard-Cambridge, 1872
 C. contentum Jocqué & Russell-Smith, 2011 — South Africa
 C. delimbatus Strand, 1906 — East Africa
 C. dippenaarae Bosmans & Van Keer, 2015 — Morocco
 C. indicus Platnick & Gajbe, 1994 — India
 C. jocqueorum Platnick, 1991 — Ivory Coast
 C. praedonius O. Pickard-Cambridge, 1872 (type) — North Africa, Greece, Cyprus, Turkey, Middle East to India, Malaysia. Introduced to USA, Cuba, Brazil, Australia (Northern Territory)
 C. reimoseri Platnick, 1991 — Eritrea, Brazil (probably introduced)

Inthaeron Platnick, 1991
 I. longipes (Gravely, 1931) — India
 I. rossi Platnick, 1991 (type) — India

References

 (2002): A revision of the Australasian ground spiders of the families Ammoxenidae, Cithaeronidae, Gallieniellidae, and Trochanteriidae (Araneae, Gnaphosoidea). Bulletin of the American Museum of Natural History 271. PDF (26Mb) — Abstract

External links
 (2011): The first North American records of the synanthropic spider.
 Hi-Res Photographs of Cithaeron praedonius

 
Araneomorphae families